Nissan Kapeta (born December 28, 1972) is a former Israeli football (soccer) player.

Honours
Israeli Third Division:
Winner (1): 1991–92
Israeli Second Division:
Winner (1): 1993–94
Runner-up (1): 2001–02
Israel State Cup:
Runner-up (1): 1996

References

1972 births
Living people
Israeli Jews
Israeli footballers
Hapoel Rishon LeZion F.C. players
Bnei Yehuda Tel Aviv F.C. players
Hapoel Tzafririm Holon F.C. players
Hapoel Nahlat Yehuda F.C. players
F.C. Shikun HaMizrah players
Footballers from Rishon LeZion
Liga Leumit players
Israeli Premier League players
Association football forwards